The Malaysia women's national squash team represents Malaysia in international squash team competitions, and is governed by Squash Racquets Association Of Malaysia.

Since 1990, Malaysia has participated in one finals of the World Squash Team Open, in 2014.

Current team
 Low Wee Wern
 Delia Arnold
 Rachel Arnold
 Sivasangari Subramaniam
 Aifa Azman

Results

World Team Squash Championships

References

See also 
 Squash Racquets Association Of Malaysia
 World Team Squash Championships
 Malaysia men's national squash team

Squash teams
Women's national squash teams
Squash
Squash in Malaysia